Pallavi Joshi (born 4 April 1969) is an Indian actress, writer, and film producer who works primarily in Hindi films and television. In a career spanning across films and television, Joshi is the recipient of such accolades as two National Film Awards, and a nomination for the Filmfare Awards.

Born in Mumbai to Marathi parents who were stage actors, Joshi made her acting debut at age four with a minor role in the Hindi film Naag Mere Sathi (1973). Following numerous film appearances as a child artist, Joshi garnered recognition and acclaim when she ventured into the Parallel cinema movement, with roles in critically acclaimed films like; Bhujangayyana Dashavathara (1988), Rihaee (1988), Rukmavati Ki Haveli (1991), and Woh Chokri (1992), for which she won the National Film Award – Special Jury Award (feature film). Joshi also appeared in several commercial films, including Insaaf Ki Awaaz (1986), Andha Yudh (1987), Mujrim (1989), Saudagar (1991), Panaah (1992). For the first of these, she was nominated for the Filmfare Award for Best Supporting Actress. Joshi's career further expanded with her venture into television, garnering praise and popular acclaim for such revered Doordarshan shows as; Talaash (1992), Aarohan (1996-1997), Alpviram (1998), Justujoo (2002-2004). In recent years, Joshi has mainly collaborated with her husband, director Vivek Agnihotri, most notably for the films; The Tashkent Files (2019), and ‘The Kashmir Files (2022), both of which she co-produced and for the former won the National Film Award for Best Supporting Actress.

Career

Films, critical acclaim and accolades
Joshi started performing on stage at an early age. She acted in films like Badla and Aadmi Sadak Ka as a child artist. She played a blind child who reforms a notorious gangster in Dada (1979). In the 1980s and early 1990s she acted in art films like Rukmavati Ki Haveli, Suraj Ka Satvan Ghoda, Trishagni (1988), Vanchit, Bhujangayyana Dashavathara (1991) and Rihaee. She also played supporting character roles as a sister or the heroine's friend in commercial big budget films including Saudagar, Panaah, Tehelka and Mujrim. She was nominated for 'Best Supporting Actress' at the Filmfare Awards for her role as a disabled girl in Andha Yudh (1988). She had won a Special Jury Award at the 41st National Film Awards for Woh Chokri (1992). She also appeared as Kasturba Gandhi in Shyam Benegal's The Making of the Mahatma, (1995). She acted with Madhavan in a thriller titled Yeh Kahaan Aa Gaye Hum, which was stopped abruptly.

Joshi has also worked in regional films, She has played the central character ‘Shantha’ in the critically acclaimed Malayalam movie Ilayum Mullum (1994), directed by K. P. Sasi and a pivotal role in the Kannada film Bhujangayyana Dashavathara (1991) enacted and directed by Lokesh. She has also played a lead role in Rita, a Marathi film directed by Renuka Shahane.

She is also the recipient of the Excellence In Cinema Award at the 7th Global Film Festival, Noida. She has won a Best Supporting Actress at the 67th National Film Awards for her performance in The Tashkent Files (2019). In 2022, she appeared in Vivek Agnihotri directorial The Kashmir Files in which she played the character of Professor Radhika Menon. Joshi was nominated as a member of Film and Television Institute of India society, but she refused to take up the position in view of the students' protest against appointment of actor and BJP member Gajendra Chauhan as the chief of the institute's governing council.

Television, hosting and other work
Joshi's most significant hosting stint was co-anchor for popular music show Zee Antakshari for 5 years. Joshi also hosted a televised singing reality show Sa Re Ga Ma Pa Marathi L'il Champs on Zee Marathi.  She also acted in some episodes of Rishtey, aired on Zee TV during 1999 and 2001. Her  TV appearances include Mr. Yogi, Bharat Ek Khoj, Justujoo, Alpviram, Mriganayani, Talash and Imtihaan and her most famous Doordarshan serial has been Aarohan, a youth serial based on the navy. Justujoo was a weekly serial on Zee TV in 2002, which also starred Harsh Chhaya and Arpita Pandey. Joshi is also a producer of Marathi serials and has produced serials including Asambhav and Anubandh on Zee Marathi.

Personal life
Joshi was born on 4 April 1969. She married Indian film maker Vivek Agnihotri in 1997 and has two children. She is the sister of child actor Master Alankar (Joshi). 

Filmography
 1973 Naag Mere Sathi
 1976 Badla (Marathi)
 1976 Khamma Mara Veera (Gujarati)
 1976 Rakshabandhan
 1977 Aadmi Sadak Ka as Pinki (Child Artists)
 1977 Daku Aur Mahatma 1977 Dream Girl as Pallavi (Child artist)
 1977 Ankh Ka Tara
 1977 Chor Ki Dadhi Main Tinka
 1977 Dost Asaava Tar Asa (Marathi)
 1977 Maa Dikri (Gujarati)
 1978 Chhota Baap
 1978 Madi Na Jaaya (Gujarati)
 1979 Dada as Munni (Child Artiste)
 1979 Parakh
 1980 Allakh Na Otle (Gujarati)
 1980 Mohabbat
 1981 Khoon Ki Takkar (Child Artiste)
 1984 Hum Bachhey Hindustan Ke (Child artist)
 1985 Susman as Chinna
 1985 Dikri Chhali sasariye (Gujarati)
 1985 Vanchit
 1986 Amrit as Sunita Saxena / Srivastav
 1986 Insaaf Ki Awaaz 1987 Andha Yudh as Saroj
 1987 Theertham as Sreedevi
 1988 Agent 777 1988 Subah Hone Tak 1988 Andha Yudh 1988 Rihaee (Special appearance)
 1988 Trishagni as Iti
 1989 Guru Dakshina 1989 Daata as Shanti
 1989 Mr. Yogi as Bride
 1989 Mujrim as Sunanda Bose
 1990 Vanchit 1990 Kroadh as Salma A. Khan
 1991 Mrignayanee (TV series)
 1991 Bhujangayyana Dashavathara (Kannada)
 1991 Jhoothi Shaan as Kaveri
 1991 Rukmavati Ki Haveli 1991 Saudagar as Amla
 1992 Mangni 1992 Priya 1992 Panaah as Mamta
 1992 Tahalka as Julie
 1992 Talaash 1993 Jeevan Mrityu Title of Zee Horror Show
 1993 Meri Pyari Nimmo 1993 Suraj Ka Satvan Ghoda as Lily
 1994 Ilayum Mullum as Santha (Malayalam)
 1994 Insaniyat as Munni
 1994 Woh Chokri (TV movie) as Afsara / Dulari / Tunni
 1995 Imtihaan 1996 Aarohan (The Ascent) (TV series)
 1996 The Making of the Mahatma as Kasturba Gandhi
 1996 Yeh Kahan Aa Gaye Hum (TV series)
 1998 Alpviram as Amrita
 1999 Chocolate (TV Movie)
 2002 Justujoo (TV series)
 2004 Kkehna Hai Kuch Mujhko (TV series)
 2009 Rita as Rita
 2013 Prem Mhanje Prem Mhanje Prem Asta 2015-16 Meri Awaaz Hi Pehchaan Hai (TV series) as Devika Gaikwad "Aai", Kalyani and Ketaki's mother
 2016 Buddha in a Traffic Jam as Sheetal Batki
 2017 Peshwa Bajirao as Tarabai
 2018 Grahan as Rama / Vasudha (Marathi)
 2019 The Tashkent Files as Aiysha Ali Shah
 2022 The Kashmir Files'' as Professor Radhika Menon

References

External links
 

Marathi people
Actresses in Marathi cinema
Indian television actresses
Living people
Actresses in Hindi cinema
Indian film actresses
1969 births
Best Supporting Actress National Film Award winners
Special Jury Award (feature film) National Film Award winners
Indian game show hosts
Actresses in Malayalam cinema
Actresses in Kannada cinema